Bruno Knežević (12 March 1915 – 26 March 1982) was a Croatian footballer. He was president of the Football Federation of Croatia, a subassociation of the Football Federation of Yugoslavia, from 1968 to 1971.

International career
He made his debut for Yugoslavia in an April 1938 World Cup qualification match against Poland, his sole international appearance.

References

"Bruno Knežević", Nogometni leksikon, Miroslav Krleža Lexicographical Institute. Zagreb, 2004.

External links
 
 Profile at Serbian federation

1915 births
1982 deaths
People from Trilj
Association footballers not categorized by position
Yugoslav footballers
Yugoslavia international footballers
FK Bokelj players
OFK Beograd players
HAŠK players
GNK Dinamo Zagreb players
Yugoslav First League players
Yugoslav football managers
GNK Dinamo Zagreb managers
NK Zagreb managers
Presidents of the Croatian Football Federation